Coster is a surname.

Coster may also refer to:

Coster or costermonger, a street seller of fruit and vegetables in Britain
10445 Coster, an asteroid

See also
 Coster Diamonds, a diamond polishing factory in Amsterdam
 Costa (disambiguation)
 Koster (disambiguation)